Geoffrey David Jeremy Walsh (known as Jeremy; born 1929) was the fifth Anglican Bishop of Tewkesbury (the suffragan bishop in the Diocese of Gloucester) from January 1986 until his retirement in October 1995.

Educated at Felsted School and Pembroke College, Cambridge Walsh studied for ordination at Lincoln Theological College before embarking on curacies in Southgate, London and Cambridge. From 1958 until 1961 he was Staff Secretary of the SCM and from then until 1966 Vicar of St Mary Moorfields, Bristol. There then followed two Rectorships of ten years apiece at, firstly, Marlborough and latterly Ipswich. Appointment to the suffragan bishopric of Tewkesbury in 1986 completed his ecclesiastical career and he retired (to Ipswich) in 1995. He was ordained and consecrated a bishop (thereby taking up his suffragan See) on 29 January 1986, by Robert Runcie, Archbishop of Canterbury, at Gloucester Cathedral.

Walsh actively took part in the concealment of sexual assaults committed by the now infamous sex offender Peter Ball.

References

1929 births
People educated at Felsted School
Alumni of Pembroke College, Cambridge
Archdeacons of Ipswich
Bishops of Tewkesbury
Living people
Alumni of Lincoln Theological College